Frederick VIII or Friedrich VIII may refer to:

Rulers 
Frederick VIII, Count of Zollern (d. 1333)
Frederick VIII, Duke of Schleswig-Holstein (1829–1880)
Frederick VIII of Denmark (1843–1912)

Ships 
SS Frederik VIII, DFDS ocean liner launched 1913, retired 1936

See also 
Frederick VIII's Palace, part of the Amalienborg palace complex in Copenhagen